Kandathil M. Mammen Mappillai (28 November 1922 – 3 March 2003) was an Indian businessman, industrialist and founder of MRF.

He graduated from Madras Christian College. He started his industrial life with a toy balloon manufacturing unit from a small shed near Madras (now Chennai) in 1946. By 1952, MRF Limited ventured into the manufacture of tread rubber. Since then, the company has grown to become a  enterprise.

In 1992, Mappillai was awarded the Padma Shri award for his contribution to industry. His brothers, K. M. Cherian, K. M. Philip and K. M. Mathew and nephew Mammen Mathew are also Padma Shri awardees. The eldest brother K.M. Cherian is also a Padma Bhushan recipient. His cousin M. K. Mathulla also was awarded Padma Shri.

Controversy
Mammen Mappillai is believed to be in the list of 18 names of account-holders in LGT Group and LGT Bank.

References
Link Dead * Head of MRF dead - 
 The man behind Indian tyre giant
 

Malayali people
Recipients of the Padma Shri in trade and industry
1922 births
2003 deaths
Businesspeople from Kerala